The 2007 Bahrain GP2 Series round was a GP2 Series motor race held on April 14 and 15, 2007 at the Bahrain International Circuit in Sakhir, Bahrain.

Classification

Qualifying

Feature race

Sprint race

References

Bahrain
GP2